Andrea Ramírez Fregoso (born 25 September 1999) is a Mexican professional racing cyclist, who currently rides for UCI Women's Continental Team . On 28 June 2019 she won the Mexican women's time trials, and two days later came second at the national road race championships.

References

External links

1999 births
Living people
Mexican female cyclists
Place of birth missing (living people)
20th-century Mexican women
21st-century Mexican women